The Ambassador Extraordinary and Plenipotentiary of the Russian Federation to the Kingdom of Belgium is the official representative of the President and the Government of the Russian Federation to the King and the Government of Belgium.

The ambassador and his staff work at large in the Embassy of Russia in Brussels. There is a consulate general in Antwerp.

History of diplomatic relations

Diplomatic relations between the Russian Empire and Belgium were first established in 1853, with the first envoy to Belgium, appointed on 11 April 1853. The last imperial envoy, continued to represent Russia as an agent of the Russian Provisional Government after the February Revolution in 1917, but ceased to be recognised by the new Soviet government after the October Revolution later that year. Diplomatic relations were established between the Soviet Union and Belgium in 1935, and a new representative,  was appointed on 2 November that year. His tenure came to an end with the German invasion and subsequent occupation of Belgium in 1940. Relations were restored once more in 1941 after the Soviet Union entered the war on the side of the allies, with  appointed envoy to the Belgian government in exile in London. By early 1943 the mission had been upgraded to an embassy. Relations continued after the war, and with the dissolution of the Soviet Union in 1991, the incumbent Soviet ambassador, continued as the representative of the Russian Federation until 1994.

List of representatives (1853 – present)

Representatives of the Russian Empire to Belgium (1853 – 1917)

Representatives of the Russian Provisional Government to Belgium (1917)

Representatives of the Soviet Union to Belgium (1935 – 1991)

Representatives of the Russian Federation to Belgium (1991 – present)

References

External links 
  Embassy of Russia to Belgium
  Embassy of Belgium to Russia

 
Belgium
Russia